Chotala is a village and union council of Jhelum District in the Punjab Province of Pakistan. It is part of Jhelum Tehsil, and is located at 32°49'0N 73°35'0E with an altitude of 214 metres (705 feet).

References

Populated places in Tehsil Jhelum
Union councils of Jhelum Tehsil